Our Man, Papa Jo! is the last studio album recorded by drummer Jo Jones in 1977 and released by the Japanese Denon label the following year.

Reception

AllMusic reviewer Scott Yanow stated "The final session for a jazz legend. Drummer Jo Jones was nearing the end when he got together with his old friends ... He still managed to play with some degree of authority and anchor the rhythm section".

Track listing
 "Take the "A" Train" (Billy Strayhorn) – 5:42
 "My Last Affair" (Haven Johnson) – 5:50
 "Stompin' at the Savoy" (Edgar Sampson, Benny Goodman, Chick Webb, Andy Razaf) – 7:09
 "Broadway" (Wilbur H Bird, Teddy McRae, Henri Woode) – 6:17
 "As Time Goes By" (Herman Hupfeld) – 2:58
 "Wrap Your Troubles in Dreams" (Harry Barris, Ted Koehler, Billy Moll) – 3:27
 "Solitude" (Duke Ellington, Eddie DeLange) – 4:25
 "It Don't Mean a Thing" (Ellington) – 4:38

Personnel 
Jo Jones – drums
Jimmy Oliver – tenor saxophone
Hank Jones – piano
Major Holley – bass

References 

1978 albums
Jo Jones albums
Denon Records albums